Domestic-international dual circulation is a Chinese government strategy to reorient the country's economy by prioritizing domestic consumption ("internal circulation") while remaining open to international trade and investment ("external circulation"). The first academic study on dual circulation defined it as "the domestic consumption-driven economic rebalancing to achieve sustainable economic development".

The economic policy of dual circulation was put forward on 14 May 2020 by the Politburo Standing Committee of the Chinese Communist Party (CCP) and later revised by CCP General Secretary Xi Jinping to stress prioritizing "internal circulation". Dual circulation involves expanding domestic demand, focusing on the domestic market, improving the country's capacity for innovation, reducing dependence on foreign markets, and at the same time remaining open to the outside world.

History 
The intellectual predecessor of dual circulation was the "great international circulation", a strategy of economic growth through export-oriented production, articulated by Wang Jian during the era of former paramount leader Deng Xiaoping.

In 2020, the COVID-19 pandemic brought a global economic downturn and a decline in demand. Along with the China–United States trade war and American trade restrictions against Huawei and other Chinese firms, this has forced the Chinese government to adopt a domestic focus. In the Chinese view, these trends towards anti-globalization, populism, and protectionism in Western countries means that China should expand its domestic markets and economic self-reliance.

On 14 May 2020, the CCP Politburo Standing Committee proposed a "new development program of mutual benefit through domestic-international dual circulation". On 23 May 2020, at the Chinese People's Political Consultative Conference 13th national committee, Xi Jinping said the country needed a development program that "takes the domestic market as the mainstay while letting internal and external markets boost each other". On 4 November 2020, during his keynote speech by video at the opening ceremony for the third China International Import Expo, Xi said that this policy "is not any kind of closed-off domestic circulation, but rather an increasingly open domestic-international dual circulation, not just for China's own development needs, but also to benefit the people of all countries". Assistant head of the CCP Central Financial and Economic Affairs Commission office Han Wenxiu said that "the proposal for a new development program that takes the domestic market as the mainstay while letting internal and external markets boost each other is the CCP's practical application of the objective laws of economic development. This is a proactive step, not a passive response; a long-term strategy, not an interim measure."

Implementation and impact
Dual circulation has recalibrated China's industrial policy to place a renewed emphasis on state-led growth and self-reliance based on China's domestic market of 1.4 billion consumers, which include over 400 million middle income consumers. In an effort to facilitate the strategy by closing technology gaps, China spent 2.5% of its GDP on research and development during the Thirteenth Five Year Plan of 2016-2020.

Dual circulation is part of China's 14th five-year plan (2021–2025). Proposals for implementing the policy include government support for domestic technology companies and working to attract more foreign investment. Analyst  of the Chongyang Institute for Financial Studies speculated that it would include government support for the service and energy sectors.

Analysis
Some observers say the dual circulation plan is not that different from previous Chinese government efforts to refocus the economy. As early as 2006, a government work report described a "strategy of expanding domestic consumption...and strengthening the role of consumption in fueling economic development". Julian Gewirtz suggested that the "dual circulation" slogan was introduced to "force focus, mobilization and prioritization".

Analysts said that the strategy would involve supporting domestic businesses and reducing China's dependence on imports, including for energy, microchips, and other technology. Economist Yu Yongding said that a key part of the project should be ensuring China's food and energy security. Economist Yao Yang described the policy as a response to worsening China–United States relations, saying that "China needs to prepare for the worst-case scenario".

Dual circulation also involves growing the Chinese middle class in order to increase domestic consumption. Economist Michael Pettis said that the plan would require transferring wealth from the government to private citizens, which would not be easy. According to the South China Morning Post, in late 2020 it remained "unclear whether China is ready to make such deep-rooted changes".

The Economist summarized the strategy as "keeping China open to the world (the 'great international circulation'), while reinforcing its own market (the 'great domestic circulation')". More specifically, The Economist said that dual circulation involves making the Chinese economy more open to foreign companies in order to make them dependent on China, which in turn would give the Chinese government more geopolitical leverage.

In 2021, a team of researchers at Nanjing University of Information Science and Technology presented the first academic study on "Dual Circulation". It identified key factors responsible for it, and presented its first comprehensive definition.

See also 
 Ideology of the Chinese Communist Party
 Reform and opening up
 Xi Jinping Thought

References 

Xi Jinping
Chinese economic policy
Foreign trade of China